Alexandru Turei (born August 7, 1952, in Cluj-Napoca) is a former light flyweight Romanian boxer who competed in the 1972 Summer Olympics.

He was defeated by Enrique Rodríguez in the first round of Olympic tournament.

References

Sports Reference

1952 births
Living people
Olympic boxers of Romania
Boxers at the 1972 Summer Olympics
Romanian male boxers
Light-flyweight boxers
Sportspeople from Cluj-Napoca